Annie Wood is an actress.

Annie Wood may also refer to:

Annie Wood Besant, née Annie Wood, social activist

See also
Ann Wood (disambiguation)